The Lost Creek Wilderness is a  wilderness area located in central Colorado in Jefferson and Park counties south of the town of Bailey. The area is situated entirely within the boundaries of the Pike National Forest.

The Lost Creek Scenic Area in the Wilderness is a 16,798-acre National Natural Landmark designated site within the Wilderness.

Wilderness 

The area is named for Lost Creek, a perennial stream that disappears and reappears before finally joining Goose Creek which empties into the South Platte River at Cheesman Reservoir just east of the Wilderness area. The entire water system of the area forms a watershed for the Platte River Basin. The area is notable for its many rock formations, natural arches, and rounded granite domes and knobs,. These are contained in two ranges of low alpine foothills of the Rocky Mountains: the Kenosha Mountains and the Tarryall Mountains.   Bison Peak is the highest peak in the wilderness.

Because of its proximity to Denver, the area is quite popular for outdoor recreation in both summer and winter months. Typical activities in the area include hiking, backpacking, rock-climbing, as well as cross-country skiing, snowshoeing and winter camping.

Lost Park, as the area is sometimes called, was one of the last refuges of the American Bison in the United States.

Scenic area 

The Lost Creek Scenic Area is a  site in the Lost Creek Wilderness created in 1963, under the 1939 "U-Regulations", which was the precursor of the Wilderness Act. It was designated a National Natural Landmark in 1966. It is located in the Pike National Forest and is in both Park and Jefferson counties. Rock formations with pinnacles and spires are located in narrow gorges and on ridges. An underground stream "disappears and reappears" nine times or more at the site.

In popular culture 
In the TV series Supernatural, Episode 2 of Season 1 takes place within the Lost Creek Wilderness area, specifically at the fictitious Blackwater Ridge.

Notes

References

IUCN Category Ib
Protected areas of Jefferson County, Colorado
Protected areas of Park County, Colorado
Wilderness areas of Colorado
Protected areas established in 1980
Pike National Forest
Natural arches of Colorado
Landforms of Jefferson County, Colorado
Landforms of Park County, Colorado